Mission to Caracas or Mission spéciale à Caracas is a 1965 spy film directed by Raoul André.

Plot 
Special agent Becker (Roland Carey) is after a briefcase that contains some secret documents. The documents are being smuggled aboard a cruise ship but, as luck would have it...

Cast
Roland Carey	... 	Gil Becker (as Rod Carter)
Jany Clair	... 	Caroline
Louise Carletti	... 	Martine de Lainville
Michel Lemoine	... 	Loys Lequemenec
Janine Reynaud	... 	Véronique
Saro Urzì	... 	Emile Vasson
Alain Gottvalles	... 	Commissaire DeBreuil
Yvonne Monlaur	... 	Muriel
Christa Lang	... 	Christelle
Dominique Page	... 	Lydia
Dominique Saint Pierre	... 	Yannick
Mireille Granelli	... 	Dominique
Sonia Bruno	... 	Laura
Christian Kerville	... 	Boris Gordine
Paul Demange	... 	Cicéron

External links
 

1965 films
1960s spy thriller films
Italian thriller films
Spanish thriller films
1960s French-language films
1960s action films
French spy thriller films
Films directed by Raoul André
Films shot in Venezuela
1960s Spanish films
1960s Italian films
1960s French films